David Angel (born June 29, 1958) is a British economic geographer and academic administrator who was the ninth president of Clark University in Worcester, Massachusetts from July 1, 2010, to June 2020.

Early life and education
Angel grew up in East London, England and received his bachelor's degree from the Department of Geography at the University of Cambridge in 1980. He came to the United States to study at University of California, Los Angeles, where he earned his master's degree and Ph.D., working on a study of labor markets in the American semiconductor industry under the advisement of Allen J. Scott.

Career 
Angel joined the faculty of Clark University in 1987 as an Assistant Professor of Geography. He became the Laskoff Professor of Economics, Technology and Environment in 1997, and was promoted to full professor in 2002.

As an economic geographer, Angel specializes in research on technological and industrial change and the possibilities for better environmental regulation by industry. Latterly he has been working in developing nations on energy efficiency issues. He has conducted research in Poland, the United States, United Kingdom, China, Indonesia, Malaysia, Thailand, and Taiwan, and published four books and numerous articles.

Angel became provost and vice president for academic affairs in 2003, responsible for all academic programs at the university. He was named the university's ninth president on July 1, 2010, succeeding John Bassett. Angel also served as chair of the New England Association of Schools and Colleges, retiring in 2019.

In January 2019, Angel announced that he would retire from his position upon the conclusion of his contract in June 2020.

Personal life 
Angel lives in Worcester, Massachusetts with his wife, Jocelyne Bauduy, and has two children.

Major publications 
 Rock, M.T. and Angel, D. 2005. Industrial Transformation in the Developing World. Oxford: Oxford University Press. .
 Angel, D. and M.T. Rock. 2000. Asia's Clean Revolution: Industry, Growth and the Environment. Sheffield: Greenleaf Publishing. .
Brown, H.S., Angel D., and P. Derr. 2000. Effective Environmental Regulation: Learning from Poland's Experience. Westport: Praeger. 
 Angel D. 1994. Restructuring for Innovation: the remaking of the U.S. semiconductor industry. New York: Guilford Press.

References

1958 births
Living people
Presidents of Clark University
Clark University faculty
Alumni of the University of Cambridge
University of California, Los Angeles alumni
English expatriates in the United States
Academics from London